The 1943–44 Penn State Nittany Lions men's ice hockey season was the 5th season of play for the program. The Nittany Lions represented Pennsylvania State University and were coached by Arthur Davis in his 4th season.

Season
With only one player returning from the previous year's team (team captain Art Gladstone), the Nittany Lions weren't in any kind of shape to compete against established teams. While the program was finally able to get into games against other varsity teams, they were embarrassed in all of their matches, losing by significant margins each time. because the war was still raging, with no end in sight, Penn State finally bowed to circumstance and suspended the program after the year.

Roster

Standings

Schedule and Results

|-
!colspan=12 style=";" | Regular Season

Scoring Statistics

References

External links

Penn State Nittany Lions men's ice hockey seasons
Penn State
Penn State
Penn State
Penn State